Nikola Georgiev Minchev (born September 13 1987) is a Bulgarian lawyer and politician who served as the Speaker of the 47th National Assembly from 2021 to 2022.

Early life and education 
Minchev was born in Sofia on September 13 1987. He has followed sports such as football since he was a child, since the time when Minyor FC and Metallurg FC were together in Group A of the Bulgarian Football League. He graduated from the German High School in Sofia, after which he obtained a master's degree in law from Sofia University.

Career

Lawyer 
Minchev began his career in the largest law firm in Bulgaria “Djingov, Guginski, Kyuchukov and Velichkov”. As a lawyer, he defended the rights of clients before the Arbitration Court of the International Chamber of Commerce. He has participated in conferences and lectured at the Energy Law Group (European Network of Lawyers in the Field of Energy Law). His experience also includes banking regulation and capital markets, as well as public procurement. He was quoted saying as a lawyer, that good laws can be achieved with good laws, so that young people do not have to choose between happiness in Bulgaria and good realization abroad.

Chairman of National Assembly 
Bulgaria's parliament, elected Minchev as Chairman of the 47th National Assembly on their first session. He was elected in a 158-1 vote with 72 abstentions.

In his first address to Parliament as Chairman Minchev thanked the MPs for their trust in him. "Today we set the start of the new Parliament. We are in the favourable stead of people who have recently won the trust of the Bulgarians. However, this favorable position is about to end. We are now faced with tackling the more difficult task of living up to the expectations and trust put in us." In his first interview, he said the closure of the specialized court and prosecutor's office will be one of the priorities of the 47th National Assembly. He also called for the common will of parliament to be born into a quality discussion, saying "to restore the spirit of mutual understanding and a new model of quality policy. I will work for the Bulgarian Parliament to be a place for free and constructive debates and discussions."

Minchev announced that some changes in the rules of procedure of the deputies would be necessary. One of the possible corrections will concern political nomadism - the transfer of members of one parliamentary group to another. Consideration will also be given to whether MPs should be tested for coronavirus once a week on admission to the building, as is the case with students.

References

1987 births
Living people
21st-century Bulgarian lawyers
Bulgarian politicians
Sofia University alumni
Chairpersons of the National Assembly of Bulgaria